Joachim genannt Thalbach may refer to:

 Anna Maria Joachim genannt Thalbach (born 1973), German actress known as Anna Thalbach
 Katharina Joachim genannt Thalbach (born 1954), German actress and stage director known as Katharina Thalbach
  (born 1995), German actress known as Nellie Thalbach
 Sabine Joachim genannt Thalbach (1932–1966), German actress known as Sabine Thalbach

See also
 Joachim (surname)
 Thalbach (disambiguation)